A diamond district is an area where the cutting, polishing, and trade of diamonds and other gems takes place. There are a number of these districts around the world, including:

 Antwerp diamond district, Belgium
 Bharat Diamond Bourse, Mumbai, India
 Diamond Exchange District, Israel
 Hatton Garden, London, England
 Jewellery Quarter, Birmingham, England
 Diamond District, Manhattan, New York, United States 
 Jewelers' Row, Philadelphia, United States
 Jewelry District (Los Angeles), United States
 Jewelry District (Providence), Rhode Island, United States
 Jewelers' Row, Chicago, United States

See also 
 Jewelry district (disambiguation)
 Diamond Historic District (Lynn, Massachusetts)

Diamond
Jewellery districts